Charkh District is situated in the southern part of Logar Province, Afghanistan. Kharwar District was created from the former big Charkh District. The distance from Kabul to Charck is about 89 km. The population is 49,354 (2019). They speak in Dari and Pashto. The district is mountainous and the winters here are severe and some villages are isolated for long periods. its main villages are Garmaba (Bandoka بندوکه is part of Garmaba), Pengram, Nawshahr, Qalai Naw, Sayda, Dasht, Kajdara, Paspajack etc. The tomb of Shah Muainuddin, Khwaja Ali, Shah Khwelwati, Mawlana Yaqoub Charkhi, Shaikh Omar, Khwaja Ismail, and Khwaja Betos are located in this district. Almost all the residents are Sunni Muslims. Shaikh Mawlana Yaqoub Charkhi a well-known scholar was from Charkh district. The popular high school in Charkh district is the Mawlana Yaqoub Charkhi High School located next to district governor office.

References

External links
The AIMS District Map of the district before its division

Districts of Logar Province